Anthony Malbrough (born December 9, 1976) is a former professional Canadian football defensive back. He was drafted in the fifth round of the 2000 NFL Draft by the Cleveland Browns. He played college football for the Texas Tech Red Raiders.

Malbrough has been a member of the Barcelona Dragons, Calgary Stampeders, Ottawa Renegades, Winnipeg Blue Bombers and Edmonton Eskimos.

College career
Malbrough's college career at  Texas Tech  included his amassing 42 tackles, 11 pass deflections, 1 interception and 1 quarterback pressure in his senior year. In his junior year, he received the J.T King Award for Most Improved Player.

Professional career
The National Football League's Cleveland Browns drafted Malbrough in the 2000 NFL Draft. That season, he registered 13 tackles.

In 2001, Malbrough played for the Barcelona Dragons of the NFL Europe. In week 2, he had 3 interceptions, returned 2 of them for touchdowns (76 and 65 yards) and he received the NFL Europe Defensive Player of the Week honor.

In 2002, Malbrough joined the Canadian Football League.  He most recently played for the Winnipeg Blue Bombers.

References

External links
 Winnipeg Blue Bombers bio

1976 births
Living people
American football cornerbacks
American players of Canadian football
Barcelona Dragons players
Calgary Stampeders players
Canadian football defensive backs
Cleveland Browns players
Edmonton Elks players
Ottawa Renegades players
People from Beaumont, Texas
Texas Tech Red Raiders football players
Winnipeg Blue Bombers players